The first season of La Voz... Argentina began on July 1, 2012 and was broadcast by Telefe. It was hosted by Marley, with model Luli Fernández interviewing the contestants at the backstage.

Contestants were also allowed to submit an online application in 2011. For the online auditions, contestants were required to record a song with a webcam.

This was the second Latin American version in The Voice franchise, after the Mexican version, La Voz... México.

Coaches and presenters
The show is hosted by Marley, with model Luli Fernández interviewing the contestants backstage. This will be the second time that Marley will be hosting a singing competition, after hosting the Argentine version of Operación Triunfo, for 4 seasons.

After a lot of rumours, the coaches for the show are: Latin pop singer Axel, folk singer Soledad Pastorutti, the vocals of the electro pop band Miranda!, Ale Sergi and Juliana Gattas, and Venezuelan singer José Luis "Puma" Rodríguez.

Teams
Color key

Blind auditions
Color key

Episode 1 (July 1)

Other Performances

Episode 2 (July 9)

Other Performances

Episode 3 (July 15)

Other Performances

Episode 4 (July 22)

Other Performances

Episode 5 (July 29)

Other Performances

Episode 6 (August 5)

Other Performances

Episode 7 (August 12)

 * During Pamela's Duarte blind audition, Axel was the only coach that pressed his button voluntarily, as he pressed the other judges' buttons. Even with this result, Pamela got the opportunity to choose which team to join. 
 Grey charts, indicate that the coach had his team already complete.

Battle rounds
After the Blind auditions, each coach had 17 contestants for the Battle rounds, which aired from August 19. Coaches began narrowing down the playing field by training the contestants with the help of "trusted advisors". Each episode featured battles consisting of pairings from within each team, and each battle concluded with the respective coach eliminating one of the two or three contestants; the nine winners for each coach advanced to the Sing-off Round.

Color key

Non competition performances

Sing-off
During this round, the 9 contestants in each team, faced a new elimination: 6 of them, advanced to the live shows, while the other 3 sang the same song they sang in the blind auditions. Once they've all done their performances, the coach saved 2 contestants, and 1 was eliminated.
Color key

Live shows

Results summary
Color key
Artist's info

Result details

Live show details
Color key

Week 1

Round 1 (October 7, 9, & 11)

Non-competition performances

Round 2 (October 14, 16, & 18)
The live performances from the second part of the first round, aired on Sunday, October 14, 2012. The elimination shows were broadcast on October 16 and 18 2012.

Non-competition performance

Week 2

Round 1 (October 21, 23, & 25)
The live performances from the first part of the second round, aired on October 21, 2012. The elimination shows were broadcast on October 23 and 25, 2012.

Non-competition performances

Round 2 (October 28, 30, & November 1)
The live performances from the second part of the second round, aired on October 28, 2012. The elimination shows were broadcast on October 30 and on November 1, 2012.

Week 3 (November 4, 6, & 8)
The live performances for the third week was aired on November 4, 2012. The elimination shows were broadcast on November 6 & 8, 2012.

Week 4: Quarterfinals (November 11, 13, & 15)
The live performances from the Quarterfinals, aired on November 11, 2012. The elimination shows were broadcast on November 13 & 15, 2012.

Week 5: Semifinals (November 18, 22, & 26)
The live performances for the Semifinals were aired on November 18, 2012. The elimination shows were broadcast on November 22 & 26, 2012.

Non-competition performances

Week 6: Finals (December 2)
The live performances and results for the Finals, aired on December 2, 2012.
Color key

Non-competition performances

References

Argentina
2012 Argentine television seasons